List of expressways in Inner Mongolia

List of routes

National-level routes

Provincial-level routes

References

External links
 
 

Transport in Inner Mongolia
Expressways in Inner Mongolia